The 2007 Mountain West Conference baseball tournament took place from May 23 through 26. The top six regular season finishers of the league's seven teams met in the double-elimination tournament held at University of Nevada, Las Vegas's Earl Wilson Stadium. Top seeded TCU won their second straight and second overall Mountain West Conference Baseball Championship with a championship game score of 9–8 and earned the conference's automatic bid to the 2007 NCAA Division I baseball tournament.

Seeding 
The top six finishers from the regular season were seeded one through six based on conference winning percentage only. Only six teams participate, so Air Force was not in the field.

Results

All-Tournament Team

Most Valuable Player 
Austin Adams, an outfielder for the champion TCU Horned Frogs, was named the tournament Most Valuable Player.

References 

Tournament
Mountain West Conference baseball tournament
Mountain West Conference baseball tournament
Mountain West Conference baseball tournament
College baseball tournaments in Nevada
Sports competitions in the Las Vegas Valley